Wallace Stewart Kilmister (born 1908 in Wellington, New Zealand – died 1973),  better known as Wally Kilmister, was an international speedway rider.

Career summary
Kilmister first rode in grasstrack in 1925, before taking up speedway. He began riding at the Kilbirnie track in Wellington in 1929 before travelling to England and joining the Wembley Lions in 1930.  In 1935 he rode in the Star Riders' Championship and in 1936 he won the New Zealand Championship. He was also a member of New Zealand and Colonies teams in the 1930s. At one time he also held the New Zealand land speed record with an average of 107 mph.

After retiring from speedway Kilmister ran a sports and model shop under his own name until the 1970s on Wembley Triangle, near to Wembley Stadium, and later returned to New Zealand and lived in Taupo where he had a motorcycle, lawnmower and chainsaw shop.

Players cigarette cards
Kilmister is listed as number 23 of 50 in the 1930s Player's cigarette card collection.

References

External links
 Taranaki Historic Speedway Association - Wally Kilmister

1908 births
1973 deaths
New Zealand speedway riders
Wembley Lions riders
Southampton Saints riders